Baboor may refer to:

Places
Babur, Iran (disambiguation), various places
Babur-e Ajam, Iran 
Babur-e Kord, Iran

People
Chetan Baboor (born 1974), Indian table tennis champion